John David Schofield (born 16 May 1965) is an English football coach and former professional footballer who is head coach of the Northern Ireland U21 team.

As a player he was a midfielder and notably played in the Football League for Lincoln City, Doncaster Rovers, Mansfield Town and Hull City making a total of 471 appearances. He also had spells in Non-league with Woolley Miners Welfare, Shepshed Charterhouse, Matlock Town and Gainsborough Trinity. Following on from his retirement, Schofield held various coaching roles back with Lincoln City where he eventually became manager and lead the club to the League Two play-offs during the 2006–07 season. He has since held a variety of different positions on the coaching staff at Scunthorpe United, Walsall, Cheltenham Town, Cambridge United, Notts County, Gillingham, York City and Doncaster Rovers.

Playing career
Schofield was born in Barnsley, West Riding of Yorkshire. A hard-working and combative midfielder, he began his career in non-League football, combining this with his job as an apprentice-trained motor mechanic. As a teenager, he had spent a season with Huddersfield Town's reserve team before joining Northern Counties East League side Woolley Miners Welfare. He moved up the non-League pyramid, joining first Shepshed Charterhouse and then Matlock Town. In March 1988 he joined Gainsborough Trinity.

Lincoln City manager Colin Murphy signed him for a £10,000 fee on 10 November 1988. Schofield made his debut in a 4–1 win over Fourth Division leaders Burnley at Turf Moor. Schofield quickly established himself in the Lincoln team, and was later voted as number 47 in Lincoln's list of 100 league legends.

Despite a successful 1993–94 season with Lincoln when he was both club captain and supporters' Player of the Season, Schofield left on 18 November 1994 when he joined Doncaster Rovers. He spent three seasons with Doncaster before departing to Mansfield Town for a £10,000 fee on 8 August 1997. Schofield joined Hull City on a free transfer on 28 July 1999.

Schofield returned to Lincoln on 6 June 2000 to take up the post of Head of Youth Development. With Lincoln beginning to struggle financially, Schofield was also called upon as a player, making a further 19 league appearances before he finally wound his playing career down.

Coaching and managerial career

Lincoln City
Schofield, a UEFA 'A' Licence holder, made impressive progress with Lincoln's youth set-up. A number of promising players, such as Lee Frecklington, either making the first team squad or being sold to higher-level clubs such as Jack Hobbs who was sold to Liverpool and Scott Loach who moved on to Watford.

Schofield's good work was rewarded with an increasing role with the first team and he was appointed first team coach prior to the start of the 2005–06 season. He signed a new two-year deal with the club in April 2006. The departure of Keith Alexander as Lincoln's manager on 24 May 2006 saw Schofield take over as caretaker manager. He was appointed as Lincoln's head coach on 15 June 2006, with John Deehan appointed as director of football.

The 2006–07 season started promisingly for Lincoln with a new-found commitment to attacking passing football which saw them top the table in October 2006 and be amongst the leading scorers in the league. However, Lincoln's form fell away in 2007 and rather than pushing for automatic promotion they were, for the fifth season running, forced to settle for a place in the play-offs. In the semi-final Lincoln were beaten 7–4 on aggregate by Bristol Rovers. His contract extended to three years on 6 August 2007, and his title was changed from head coach to manager.

The poor form exhibited by Lincoln in the second half of the 2006–07 season continued into 2007–08 and this was met with increasing unease by the Lincoln supporters with a feeling that Schofield has neglected the defence of the squad in favour of his attacking strategy. Schofield was sacked by Lincoln on 15 October 2007, after a run of nine matches without a win.

Scunthorpe United and Walsall
In February 2008 he began coaching at Scunthorpe United, where he helped carried out extra training sessions for players not involved in the first team before departing at the end of the season. On 17 June 2008 he was appointed first-team coach at Walsall, to work under manager Jimmy Mullen. Schofield was appointed manager on a caretaker basis after Mullen was sacked on 10 January 2009. He took charge for just one match, a 1–0 defeat away to Peterborough United, but left on 20 January 2009 ahead of the appointment of manager Chris Hutchings, who brought in his own right-hand man in former Walsall player Martin O'Connor.

Cheltenham Town
On 20 March 2009, Cheltenham Town's manager Martin Allen appointed Schofield as his assistant on an initial expenses-only basis. The appointment was made full-time on 14 May 2009, when Schofield agreed a two-year contract. On 20 October 2009, he became caretaker manager of the club after Allen was placed on gardening leave whilst an alleged incident involving Allen at a nightclub was investigated. Although Allen was subsequently cleared by an internal club investigation, on 11 December 2009 he left the club by mutual consent with Schofield remaining in temporary charge. Although he was interviewed for the permanent manager's role, his erstwhile Lincoln teammate Mark Yates was appointed with Schofield reverting to his role as assistant manager. His spell as caretaker manager had consisted of nine matches with just a single victory: a 5–1 defeat of Barnet. A restructuring of the backroom team saw Schofield depart Whaddon Road after fifteen months at the club.

Cambridge United
On 6 July 2010 he joined Cambridge United on a trial basis to assist manager Martin Ling with the club's pre-season preparations. Having impressed, he joined the club on a two-year contract to become first team coach. Following a run of four successive defeats, he and Ling were sacked by Cambridge on 1 February 2011.

Notts County
On 11 April 2011, Notts County appointed Martin Allen as manager on a one-year rolling contract and he quickly appointed Schofield as first-team coach. Although Allen steered the club clear of relegation in 2010–11, he was sacked on 18 February 2012 with the club occupying 11th place in League One. Two days later, following the appointment of Keith Curle as manager, Schofield also departed Meadow Lane.

Gillingham
In July 2012, he linked up with Martin Allen for a third time, when he became his assistant at Gillingham. Although Allen led the club to the League Two title in 2012–13, after winning just two of their first eleven league games in 2013–14, he was sacked on 13 October 2013. Schofield was placed in caretaker charge before Peter Taylor was appointed interim manager a day later. He remained part of the backroom staff under Taylor, before leaving his role on 6 May 2014.

Scunthorpe United and York City

On 23 June 2014, Schofield was appointed assistant manager at Scunthorpe. He had played with the club's manager Russ Wilcox at Doncaster whilst the two also completed their coaching badges and pro-licence on the same courses. On 8 October 2014, Schofield and Wilcox were sacked by Scunthorpe, after the team started 2014–15 with two wins from eleven matches.

On 30 December 2014 he returned to Lincoln in a voluntary coaching capacity, before resuming his relationship with Wilcox through being appointed his assistant at League Two club York City on 21 May 2015. With York 21st in the table after a nine-match run without a win, Wilcox and Schofield were sacked.

Doncaster Rovers 
On 7 September 2016, Schofield returned to former club Doncaster Rovers as a Senior Professional Development Coach, working with youth players and younger first-team players to bridge the gap between the squads.

Northern Ireland Men's U-21's 
On 26 July 2021, Schofield became the new manager of Northern Ireland's Under-21 men's team.

Managerial statistics

Honours
Player

Individual
Lincoln City Player of the Season: 1993–94

Manager

Individual
League Two Manager of the Month: October 2006

References

External links

1965 births
Living people
Footballers from Barnsley
English footballers
Association football midfielders
Woolley Miners Welfare F.C. players
Shepshed Dynamo F.C. players
Matlock Town F.C. players
Gainsborough Trinity F.C. players
Lincoln City F.C. players
Doncaster Rovers F.C. players
Mansfield Town F.C. players
Hull City A.F.C. players
English Football League players
English football managers
Lincoln City F.C. managers
Walsall F.C. managers
Cheltenham Town F.C. managers
Gillingham F.C. managers
English Football League managers
Lincoln City F.C. non-playing staff
Scunthorpe United F.C. non-playing staff
Walsall F.C. non-playing staff
Cheltenham Town F.C. non-playing staff
Cambridge United F.C. non-playing staff
Notts County F.C. non-playing staff
Gillingham F.C. non-playing staff
York City F.C. non-playing staff
Doncaster Rovers F.C. non-playing staff